Can't Help Falling In Love (Instrumental Love Songs), Vol. 1 is the debut studio album by Canadian husband-and-wife instrumental pop duo SaxAndViolin. The album, featuring Eli Bennett on tenor saxophone and Rosemary Siemens on violin, included songs that inspired the couple's love story and was released worldwide on February 14, 2020, through SaxAndViolin Records. The album debuted as the #3 Pop Album on the Canadian iTunes Charts.

Recording 
The album was recorded at SaxAndViolin Studios in Vancouver, BC, Canada, over the course of several months of 2019.

Track listing

Personnel 
Eli Bennett - tenor saxophone
Rosemary Siemens - violin, piano (vocals on track 8 only)

Release history

Music videos

Awards and nominations 

 2020 Covenant Award for Instrumental Song of the Year (You Say, winner)
 2020 Covenant Award for Children's Song of the Year (Rosemary Siemens feat. SaxAndViolin, You and Me, winner)

References

External links 
Official website
SaxAndViolin on iTunes
SaxAndViolin discography at Discogs

2020 debut albums
Instrumental albums
Pop albums by Canadian artists